Palanas, officially the Municipality of Palanas,  is a 4th class municipality in the province of Masbate, Philippines. According to the 2020 census, it has a population of 27,322 people.

Palanas was created in 1951 from the barrios of Palanas, Nipa, Nabangig, Banco, Pina, Maanahao, Salvacion, Antipolo, Malatawan, Intusan, Miabas, San Antonio, Libtong, Malibas, Santa Cruz, Bontod and Cabil-isan of Dimasalang. It annually celebrates "Pasayaw sa Leon" Festival (The Lion Dance Festival) every 19 December.

Geography

Barangays
Palanas is politically subdivided into 24 barangays.

Climate

Demographics

Economy

References

External links
 [ Philippine Standard Geographic Code]
Philippine Census Information
Local Governance Performance Management System

Municipalities of Masbate